John Thomas Norris (1808 – 15 January 1870) was a British Liberal politician who served as the Member of Parliament (MP) for Abingdon 1857–65.

He was a Commissioner of Lieutenancy for London, a justice of the peace in Berkshire, and member of the London City Corporation.

References

External links 

1808 births
1870 deaths
Liberal Party (UK) MPs for English constituencies
UK MPs 1857–1859
UK MPs 1859–1865
Councilmen and Aldermen of the City of London